Acecarbromal (INN) (brand names Sedamyl, Abasin, Carbased, Paxarel, Sedacetyl, numerous others), also known as acetylcarbromal and acetyladalin, is a hypnotic and sedative drug of the ureide (acylurea) group discovered by Bayer in 1917 that was formerly marketed in the United States and Europe. It is also used in combination with extract of quebracho and vitamin E as a treatment for erectile dysfunction under the brand name Afrodor in Europe. Acecarbromal is structurally related to the barbiturates, which are basically cyclized ureas. Prolonged use is not recommended as it can cause bromine poisoning.

See also 
 Bromisoval
 Carbromal

References 

Erectile dysfunction drugs
GABAA receptor positive allosteric modulators
Hypnotics
Organobromides
Sedatives
Ureas